The Sam Houston Bearkats football program is the intercollegiate American football team for Sam Houston State University located in the U.S. state of Texas. The team competes in the NCAA Division I Football Championship Subdivision (FCS) as a member of the Western Athletic Conference through the 2020–21 season. Sam Houston's first football team was fielded in 1912. The team plays its home games at the 12,593-seat Bowers Stadium in Huntsville, Texas. On January 23, 2014, K. C. Keeler was named the 15th head coach in Sam Houston program history.

In July 2021, the Bearkats left the Southland Conference to join the Western Athletic Conference, which relaunched its football league at the FCS level at that time. Just a few months later, on November 5, 2021, the school accepted an invitation to join Conference USA at the NCAA Division I Football Bowl Subdivision (FBS) level beginning in the 2023–24 season.

History
Sam Houston has fielded a football team since 1912 and have played continuously since 1946 following World War II. The only times the Bearkats did not field a football team were in 1918 for World War I, from 1943 to 1945 for World War II, and 2020 due to the COVID-19 pandemic (although they did get a make-up season in the spring of 2021). The Bearkats competed independently from 1912 through 1923, in the Texas Intercollegiate Athletic Association (TIAA) from 1924 to 1931, in the National Association of Intercollegiate Athletics (NAIA) from 1932 to 1981, in NCAA Division II from 1982 to 1985 and in the Southland Conference of the NCAA Division I FCS from 1986 to 2021. In July 2021, The Bearkats left the Southland Conference to join the Western Athletic Conference, which relaunched its football league at the FCS level at that time. Just a few months later, on November 5, 2021, the school accepted an invitation to join FBS Conference USA beginning in the 2023-24 season.

The Bearkats won their first FCS National Championship in the 2020-21 college football season, beating South Dakota State 23-21.

The Bearkats have 15 conference championships, and have seen postseason NCAA playoff action in 13 seasons, with back-to-back NCAA Division I Championship game appearances in 2011–2012. Sam Houston State also has 3 bowl victories in four games, and one claimed National Championship from NAIA in the 1964 season.

Head coaches
Ron Randleman is Sam Houston's and the Southland Conference's all-time winningest coach with 132 wins over a span of 23 years. Randleman also won conference Coach of the Year honors on four occasions, in the Gulf Star Conference in 1985 and 1986, and in the Southland Conference in 1991, and 2001.

Paul Pierce coached the Bearkats to its only National Championship as a member of NAIA, and also won the 1965 Knute Rockne Little All-American Coach of the Year award.

Willie Fritz coached Sam Houston to back-to-back conference championships and back-to-back national title game appearances in only three years, while being awarded the 2011 AFCA National Coach of the Year award and the 2012 Liberty Mutual Coach of the Year award. He was also named the 2012 AFCA Regional Coach of the Year.

On January 23, 2014, former Delaware head coach K. C. Keeler was named the 15th head coach in Sam Houston program history. So far, he has arguably had the most success as a Sam Houston head coach boasting a .777 overall win percentage and a .736 playoff win percentage, in addition to winning a conference title four out of his eight seasons as head coach, and a Division I national championship in 2020. Sidenote: Keeler has only lost a home playoff game once in his entire career as a head coach.

Championships

National championships
Sam Houston has two national championships, with one during their tenure in the National Association of Intercollegiate Athletics and the other coming in FCS. In their NAIA championship game, they played Concordia Cobbers for the championship, with the game resulting in a tie, becoming co-champions with Moorhead. In their third FCS championship game, they defeated South Dakota State to win their first FCS national championship.

Conference championships
Sam Houston has won 15 conference titles, seven shared and eight outright.

† Denotes shared title.

Conference affiliations

 1912–1923: Independent
 1924–1930: Texas Intercollegiate Athletic Association
 1931–1981: Lone Star Conference (NAIA)
 1982–1983: Lone Star Conference (NCAA Division II)
 1984–1986: Gulf Star Conference (Division I FCS)
 1987–2020: Southland Conference (Division I FCS)
 2021–2023: Western Athletic Conference (Division I FCS)
 2023–present: Conference USA (Division I FBS)

Bowl game appearances
Sam Houston appeared in five bowl games during their time in the NAIA, going 3–0–1 in these bowl games, with the final one notably being for the NAIA championship.

Playoff appearances

NCAA Division I-AA/FCS
The Bearkats have appeared in the I-AA/FCS playoffs 13 times with an overall record of 24–12. They were NCAA Division I National Champions in 2020.

NAIA 
The Bearkats appeared in the NAIA playoffs one time, with a combined record of 1–0–1.

Home stadiums

Pritchett Field (1912–1985)
The Bearkats' home for football was on Pritchett Field for 73 years (1912–1985) beginning with their first football game against Rice University in 1912. The field was named after Joseph Pritchett, brother of the university's fourth president Henry Carr Pritchett, and former owner of the land the field rests on.

The final football game played on Pritchett Field was a victory for the Bearkats with a score of 51–7, defeating Washburn University. Sam Houston Football began playing games at Bowers Stadium following the 1985 season.  The complex is currently home to Sam Houston Women's Soccer and Club Lacrosse.

On April 18, 2013, football was played on Pritchett Field for the first time since 1985 for the annual Orange-White spring game. The event also included the presentation of the Liberty Mutual Coach of the Year Award to head coach Willie Fritz.

Bowers Stadium (1986–present)
 Bowers Stadium, formerly Bearkat Stadium (1986–1989), is currently home to both Sam Houston Football and the Track and Field programs beginning with the 1986 season. Bowers Stadium has a capacity of 14,000. However, 16,148 fans packed Bowers Stadium in 1994 to watch Alcorn State led by NFL bound quarterback Steve McNair in a 48-23 SAM HOUSTON victory on regional ABC-TV.

Rivalries

Stephen F. Austin

The Sam Houston/Stephen F. Austin rivalry game, also known as the Battle of the Piney Woods, is a yearly rivalry held at NRG Stadium in Houston. The two teams have met 91 times with Sam Houston leading the series 60-34-2. The Battle of the Piney Woods is Texas' second longest FCS rivalry. The most recent meeting ending with the Bearkats defeating the Lumberjacks 21-20 and clinching their 10th win in a row. However, the rivalry is now in question as Sam Houston has officially announced their move from the Western Athletic Conference to Conference USA in 2023.

Texas State

Sam Houston State’s second longest rivalry (dating back to 1915) was Texas State University. The two teams held annual rivalry games in mainly football and basketball with Texas State boasting a 50-37-5 record in football (last game in 2011) and a 64-51 record in men’s basketball (last game in 2012). The two universities are in the same university system (sharing many similarities) and competed in the same athletic conferences until Texas State left the Southland Conference for the Western Athletic Conference in 2012, eventually ending up in the Sun Belt Conference only a year later in 2013.

Notable former players

Bearkats in the National Football League
Sam Houston has had 37 alumni play in the National Football League, with 19 players selected in the Draft. During the 2018 NFL Draft, the Oakland Raiders selected defensive lineman P. J. Hall in the second round. This represents the highest a Bearkat player has been drafted by an NFL team.

Timothy Flanders (2014-2015), RB, New Orleans Saints, Clevland Browns
Timothy Flanders CFL (2015-Present), RB/WR, BC Lions, Winnipeg Blue Bombers, Calgary Stampeders, Ottawa RedBlacks
Scorpio Babers (2008–2009), CB, Miami Dolphins, Green Bay Packers
Michael Bankston (1992–2000), DL, Arizona Cardinals, Cincinnati Bengals
Stan Blinka (1979–1983), LB, New York Jets
Rhett Bomar (2009–2012), QB, New York Giants, Minnesota Vikings, Oakland Raiders
Davion Davis (2019–Present), WR, Minnesota Vikings, Cleveland Browns
Keith Davis (2002–2008), DB, Dallas Cowboys
Tim Denton (1998–2000), DB, Washington Redskins, San Diego Chargers
Johnnie Dirden (1978–1981), WR, Houston Oilers, Kansas City Chiefs, Pittsburgh Steelers
Trey Diller (2013), WR, Carolina Panthers
Matt Dominguez (2001), TE, Denver Broncos
Lac Edwards (2016–2021), P, New York Jets
P. J. Hall (2018–Present), DT, Oakland Raiders
Odie Harris (1988–1995), DB, Tampa Bay Buccaneers, Cleveland Browns, Arizona Cardinals, Houston Oilers
Keith Heinrich (2002–2004, 2007), TE, Carolina Panthers, Cleveland Browns, Tampa Bay Buccaneers
Jimmy Hill (1955–1966), DB, Chicago/St. Louis Cardinals, Detroit Lions, Kansas City Chiefs
Ed Kallina (1928), OL, Chicago Bears
Garry Kimble (1987), CB, Washington Redskins
Josh McCown (2002–2020), QB, Arizona Cardinals, Detroit Lions, Oakland Raiders, Miami Dolphins, Carolina Panthers, San Francisco 49ers, Chicago Bears, Tampa Bay Buccaneers, Cleveland Browns, New York Jets, Philadelphia Eagles, Houston Texans
Guido Merkens (1978–1987), DB QB P WR, Houston Oilers, New Orleans Saints, Philadelphia Eagles
Mike Nelms (1980–1984), DB, Washington Redskins
Ralph Ruthstrom (1945–1949), FB HB QB, Cleveland/LA Rams, Washington Redskins, Baltimore Colts
Julian Spence (1956–1961), DB, Chicago Cardinals, San Francisco 49ers, Houston Oilers
D. D. Terry (2007–2008), RB, Jacksonville Jaguars, Houston Texans
George Wright (1970–1972), DT, Baltimore Colts, Cleveland Browns

Individual awards

National awards
Sam Houston has had a total of 88 players selected into the College Football All-America Team, including 58 NCAA All-Americans and 30 NAIA All-Americans. A number of these players have also been considered for major national awards. In 2016, quarterback Jeremiah Briscoe became the first Bearkat to win the Payton Award. In 2017 he became the first Bearkat to win two Payton Awards and only the second FCS player to win multiple Payton Awards after former Appalachian State quarterback Armanti Edwards became the first in 2009.

Major honors

Walter Payton Award FinalistsMost Outstanding FCS Offensive Player
Chris Chaloupka, QB, 1999 – 13th
Josh McCown, QB, 2001 – 7th
Dustin Long, QB, 2004 – 2nd
D. D. Terry, RB, 2006 – 16th
Timothy Flanders, RB, 2011 – 7th, 2012 – 13th
Jeremiah Briscoe, QB, 2016 - Winner, 2017 Winner
Buck Buchanan Award FinalistsMost Outstanding FCS Defensive Player
Keith Davis, DB, 2001 – 7th
Darnell Taylor, S, 2012 – 14th
P. J. Hall, DE, 2016 - 3rd
Derick Roberson, DE, 2018 - 2nd
AFCA Coach of the Year
Willie Fritz, National, 2011
Willie Fritz, Regional, 2011 & 2012
Eddie Robinson AwardCoach of the Year
K. C. Keeler - 2016

Conference awards
Sam Houston has had 407 All-Conference selections and honorable mentions, including 202 in the Southland Conference, 25 in the Gulf Star Conference, 173 in the Lone Star Conference, and 7 in the Texas Intercollegiate Athletic Association.

 Player of the Year
Lanny Dycus, QB, Gulf Star (1985)
Chris Chaloupka, QB, Southland (1999)
Josh McCown, QB, Southland (2001)
Dustin Long, QB, Southland (2004)
Timothy Flanders, RB, Southland (2011 & 2012)
Jeremiah Briscoe, QB, Southland (2016)
 Offensive Player of the Year
Chris Chaloupka, QB, Southland (1999)
D. D. Terry, RB, Southland (2006)
Richard Sincere, WR, Southland (2011)
Jared Johnson, QB, Southland (2015)
Yedidiah Louis, WR, Southland (2016)
Davion Davis, WR, Southland (2017)
 Defensive Player of the Year
Keith Davis, DB, Southland (2000)
Darnell Taylor, S, Southland (2011 & 2012)
P.J. Hall, DE, Southland (2016)

 Freshman of the Year
Bart Bradley, P, Gulf Star (1986)
Victor McKnight, C, Southland (1996)
Matt Dominguez, WR, Southland (1997)
P.J. Hall, DE, Southland (2014)
Nathan Stewart, WR, Southland (2016)
 Newcomer of the Year
Tim Denton, DB, Southland (1995)
Chris Chaloupka, QB, Southland (1999)
Timothy Flanders, RB, Southland (2010)
 Coach of the Year
Ron Randleman, Gulf Star (1986)
Ron Randleman, Southland (1991 & 2001)
Willie Fritz, Southland (2011)
K. C. Keeler, Southland (2016)

Individual program records

Rushing records
Most rushing attempts, career: 999, Timothy Flanders (2010–2013)
Most rushing attempts, season: 298, Timothy Flanders (2011)
Most rushing attempts, game: 39, Charles Harris vs North Texas (1993)
Most rushing yards, career: 5,664, Timothy Flanders (2010–2013)
Most rushing yards, season: 1,644, Timothy Flanders (2011)
Most rushing yards, game: 287, Timothy Flanders vs Montana (2011)
Most rushing touchdowns, career: 66, Timothy Flanders (2010–2013)
Most rushing touchdowns, season: 22, Timothy Flanders (2011)
Most rushing touchdowns, game: 5, Timothy Flanders (September 20, 2011 vs. New Mexico)
Longest rush from scrimmage: 90 yards, Charles Harris vs Rice (1993), Arthur Louis vs SFA (1978), Dennis Gann vs Texas A&I (1966)
Most games with at least 100 rushing yards, career: 30, Timothy Flanders (2010–2013)
Most games with at least 100 rushing yards, season: 10, Timothy Flanders (2012)
Most games with at least 200 rushing yards, career: 2, Charles Harris (1993), D. D. Terry (2006), Timothy Flanders (2011–2012)
Most games with at least 200 rushing yards, season: 2, Charles Harris (1993, D. D. Terry (2006)

Passing records
Most passing attempts, career: 1,328, Jeremiah Briscoe (2015–17)
Most passing attempts, season: 579, Jeremiah Briscoe (2017)
Most passing attempts, game: 69, Rhett Bomar vs Southeastern Louisiana (2008)
Most passing completions, career: 1,328, Jeremiah Briscoe (2015–17)
Most passing completions, season: 333, Dustin Long (2004)
Most passing completions, game: 38, Dustin Long vs Eastern Washington at FCS Quarterfinals (2004)
Most passing yards, career: 11,488, Jeremiah Briscoe (2015–17)
Most passing yards, season: 5,003, Jeremiah Briscoe (2004)
Most passing yards, game: 577, Dustin Long vs McNeese State (2004)
Most passing touchdowns, career: 116, Jeremiah Briscoe (2015–17)
Most passing touchdowns, season: 57, Jeremiah Briscoe (2016)
Most passing touchdowns, game: 7, Jeremiah Briscoe (2016)
Longest pass completion: 99 yards, Binky Ford to Frankie Reescano vs Howard Payne University (1980)
Most games with at least 300 passing yards, season: 11, Jeremiah Briscoe  (2016)
Most Victories as a Starting Quarterback: 39, Brian Bell (2010-2013)

Receiving records
Most receptions, career: 294, Yedidiah Louis (2014-2017)
Most receptions, season: 99, Jarrod Fuller (2004)
Most receptions, game: 13, Four Times: Jason Mathenia (2004), Torrance Williams (2013), Davion Davis (2017, 2018)
Most receiving yards, career: 3,942, Yedidiah Louis (2014-2017)
Most receiving yards, season: 1,648, Nathan Stewart (2017)
Most receiving yards, game: 268, Nathan Stewart vs McNeese (2016)
Most touchdown receptions, career: 40, Davion Davis (2015-2018)
Most touchdown receptions, season: 18, Jonathon Cooper (2001)
Most touchdown receptions, game: 4, Matt Dominguez vs Nicholls State (1999)
Longest pass reception: 97 yards, Frankie Reescano from Blinky Ford vs Howard Payne (1980)
Most games with at least 100 receiving yards, career: 16, Nathan Stewart (2016-2019)

Defensive records
Most tackles, career: 538, Stan Blinka (1975–1978)
Most tackles, season: 211, Stan Blinka (1978)
Most tackles, game: 24, Stan Blinka (1978 vs Stephen F. Austin)
Most sacks, career: 42, P. J. Hall (2014-2017)
Most sacks, season: 15, Andre Finley (1988)
Most sacks, game: 4, Michael Bankston (1991 vs Angelo State), Will Henry (2010 vs Nicholls State)
Most interceptions, career: 14, Daxton Swanson (2009–2012)
Most interceptions, season: 8, Daxton Swanson (2011)
Most interceptions, game: 3, Charles Stanley vs. Howard Payne (1977), Mark Hughes vs. McNeese State (2004)

Future non-conference opponents
Future non-conference opponents announced as of October 14, 2022.

 The Air Force game in 2023, will be played at NRG Stadium in Houston.

References

External links
 

 
American football teams established in 1912
1912 establishments in Texas